Robert MacLean is a U.S. Transportation Security Administration, aviation security, and national security whistleblower.

Robert MacLean or McLean may also refer to:
 Robert MacLean (EastEnders)
 Rob MacLean (born 1958), Scottish sports presenter
 Douglas Maclean (Robert Donald Douglas Maclean, 1852–1929), New Zealand politician
 Robert McLean (footballer) (1884–1936), Scottish footballer

See also
 Bob McLean (disambiguation)
 Robert McLane (1867–1904), American politician, military officer, and diplomat